Dávid Bélaváry de Szikava (born ca. 1580) (szikavai és Bélaváry Dávid in Hungarian ; David Belevari/Belavary in Latin ; Давид Шикован-Біловарі [David Shykovan-Bilovari] in Ukrainian) was a diplomat and high  official of the Kingdom of Hungary during the seventeenth century.

Biography 
Member of the Bélaváry family, he is the son on György Both Bélaváry de Szikava and Fruzsina Vizkelety. Dávid is quoted in 1600 as the prefect and judge of the court (udvarbíró) of several places, as the house of the Archdiocese of Esztergom in Körmöcbánya. In 1604, he attended  István Bocskai during the anti-Habsburg uprising (1604–1606). He was also governor of  Galgocz and  Likava and governor of the domains of the primate of Hungary (cited in 1618 and 1620).

He appears in the entourage of Prince Gabriel Bethlen in 1619 and becomes January 23, 1620 the administrator of his property and income (universorum bonorum administrator). Thereby Dávid Bélaváry is the prefect of the prince, his economic policy maker and his economic expert in Upper Hungary.

An influential councillor, he became in 1621 the president and administrator of the Chamber of Upper Hungary (also called "Chamber of Szepes" or "Chamber of Kassa") - supreme institution for the finances and economy of Upper Hungary - until the death of Bethlen in 1629.
Delegated commissioner of his Excellency, he is quoted as "supreme prefect of the Chamber, councilor and supreme prefect of the region of cis- and ultra Tybiscanus" (camerae supremus praefectus, consiliarius necnon omnium artium cis and ultra Tibiscanorum supremus praefectus in Latin). As example the region of Cis-Tybiscanus including the following counties: Abaujvariensis, Bereghiensis, Borsodiensis, Gömöriensis, Hevesiensis et Szolnok mediocris, Sarosiensis, Scepusiensis, Tornensis, Unghvariensis and Zempliniensis.

He was lord of Vörösvár, Kovászó, Bene, Konaszo, etc.

References 

Elemér Kovács: Szőlészet, borászat, Beregvidéken, Kárpátaljai Magyar Könyvek 192, Budapest, 32. (2009)    
Marcel Burchard-Bélavary : Story of the Burchard-Bélaváry family ("Histoire de la Famille Burchard-Bélavàry"), Éd. Berger-Levrault & Cie, Nancy, 1906 ; La Hulpe, Bruxelles, 2001

17th-century Hungarian people
Hungarian nobility
Dávid Bélaváry
Hungarian diplomats
Hungarian politicians